Rare is a British video game developer founded by Tim and Chris Stamper after the now-defunct Ultimate Play the Game. Since its inception, the company has produced various titles in a wide variety of genres and on numerous gaming systems, mostly from Nintendo and Microsoft. The company is best known for its platform games, which include the Donkey Kong Country series and the Banjo-Kazooie series, and for its Nintendo 64 first-person shooters GoldenEye 007 and Perfect Dark. This list includes games produced by Rare after its formation. It does not include games developed or published by Ultimate Play the Game.

Games

References

External links
 Rare's official website

Rare games